Ingeniero Foster is a village and rural locality (municipality) in the Rancul Department of La Pampa Province in Argentina.  The nearest towns are La Maruja and Arizona in San Luis Province.

References

Populated places in La Pampa Province